Breathing Is E-Zee is a song by English electronic music group E-Zee Possee, featuring the vocals of English writer, broadcaster, and producer Tara Newley. It made #72 on the UK Singles Chart in 1991.

Critical reception
Pan-European magazine Music & Media wrote, "Featuring soulful vocalist Tara Newley, this modern dance tune breathes the old Stax rhythm 'n blues sound in a Sly & Robbie type of production. The influence of Deee-Lite is e-zee to identify as well. Smoking!"

Charts

Personnel

E-Zee Possee
 Jeremy Healy - production, mixing, keyboards, bass, drums
 Simon Rogers - engineering, keyboards

Featured musicians
 Tara Newley - vocals
 Shawn Lee - guitars

References

1991 singles
1991 songs
E-Zee Possee songs
Song articles with missing songwriters